Northlands Park is an unincorporated railway point in the municipality of Gauthier, Timiskaming District in Northeastern Ontario, Canada.

Northlands Park was established in the 1920s at the construction of the Nipissing Central Railway line between Swastika (Ontario) and Rouyn-Noranda (Quebec) at mile 14.1. The line continues to be operated, as a subsidiary of the Ontario Northland Railway, as a freight spur.

References

Communities in Timiskaming District